Eagleville is a census-designated place (CDP) in Centre County, Pennsylvania, United States. The population was 324 at the 2010 census.

Geography
Eagleville is located in northeastern Centre County at  (41.0564538, -77.5927705), in the eastern corner of Liberty Township. It is bordered to the north by Bald Eagle Creek, a tributary of the West Branch Susquehanna River.

 land.

References

Census-designated places in Centre County, Pennsylvania
Census-designated places in Pennsylvania